Roni is a given name.

Notable people with the name include:

 Roni (footballer) (born 1995), Brazilian footballer
 Rôni (born 1977), Brazilian former footballer, Roniéliton Pereira Santos
 Roni Bar-On (born 1948), Israeli politician and lawyer
 Roni Benise, American guitarist
 Roni Beroperay (born 1992), Indonesian footballer
 Aharon Roni Brizon (born 1944), Israeli former politician
 Roni Calderon (born 1952), Israeli former footballer
 Roni Dalumi (born 1991), Israeli singer
 Roni Lynn Deutch (born 1963), American former tax attorney
 Roni Horn (born 1955), American visual artist and writer
 Roni Jones-Perry (born 1997), American volleyball player
 Roni Milo (born Ron Milikovsky in 1949), Israeli politician, lawyer and journalist
 Roni Peiponen (born 1997), Finnish footballer
 Ronei Gleison Rodrigues dos Reis (born 1991), Brazilian footballer known as Roni
 Roni Rosenfeld (born 1959), Israeli-American computer scientist
 Roni Shuruk (born 1946), Israeli former footballer
 Roni Size (born Ryan Williams in 1969), British record producer and DJ
 Roni Stoneman (born 1938), American banjo player, former cast member of the Hee Haw TV show
 Roni (footballer, born 1993), Spanish footballer